This is a list of Dutch television related events from 1985.

Events
17 November - Debut of Soundmixshow, a series hosted by Henny Huisman in which members of the public impersonate their favourite singers.
November–December - The first series of Soundmixshow was won by Glenda Peters performing as Randy Crawford.

Debuts
17 November - Soundmixshow (1985-2002)

Television shows

1950s
NOS Journaal (1956–present)

1970s
Sesamstraat (1976–present)

1980s
Jeugdjournaal (1981–present)

Ending this year

Births
19 March - Yolanthe Sneijder-Cabau, Spanish-born actress & TV host
8 May - Nikkie Plessen, actress, TV presenter & model
31 December - Jan Smit, singer & TV host

Deaths